Virendra Kumar may refer to:

Virendra Kumar Baranwal (born 1941), Indian poet and writer
Virendra Kumar Choudhary (born 1953), Indian politician, a member of parliament from Jhanjharpur (Lok Sabha constituency)
Virendra Kumar Khatik (born 1954), Indian politician from Tikamgarh Lok Sabha constituency, Tikamgarh
Virendra Kumar Jaati, Indian politician from Jhabrera Assembly constituency, Uttarakhand
Virendra Kumar Sakhlecha (1930–1999), an Indian politician who served as the 10th Chief Minister Of Madhya Pradesh
Virendra Kumar Sharma (born 1947), British-Indian Labour Party politician
Virendra Kumar Singh (born 1953), Indian politician and former MLA of Nabinagar Assembly constituency, Bihar
Virendra Kumar Tewari (born 1955), agricultural engineer, professor and director at IIT Kharagpur
Virendra Kumar Yadav (born 1976), Indian politician and member of the 17th Legislative Assembly of Uttar Pradesh